In Greek mythology, Eunostus or Eunostos was a goddess whose image was set up in mills, and who was believed to keep watch over the just weight of flour.

Promylaia ("the one that stands before/protects the mill") was another name for a goddess of the mills, who was worshipped in the same fashion as Eunostus. Both Eunostus and Promylaia could actually have been mere epithets of Demeter.

References

 Smith, William, Dictionary of Greek and Roman Biography and Mythology, London (1873). Eunostus (2).

Greek goddesses